Hovhannes Khan Masehian (February 23, 1864 in Tehran - November 19, 1931 in Kharbin) was an Iranian Armenian translator and diplomat, well known as the translator of Shakespeare's and Byron's works into Armenian. Since 1912 he was the Persian Ambassador to Germany. From 1927 to 1929 he was the Persian Ambassador to the Great Britain. He was the first Ambassador of Persia in Japan.

Masehian's translation of Hamlet was printed in 1894 by the Armenian publishing society.  Hovhannes Hovhannisyan and Hovhannes Tumanyan praised this translation in their reviews. According to Gevorg Emin, Masehian's translations are "excellent" and "sound so wonderful in Armenian". The polished and refined translations by Masehian have always been among the greatest treasures in the long history of Armenian translation activities.

Masehian was the editor of the Armenian journal Shavigh Tehran, 1894).

As a diplomat, he was responsible for introducing Western political thought and technological innovations into Iran. He was a delegate to the Sixth Majles.

After holding the position of Iranian ambassador to Great Britain from 1927-1929, in 1930 Masehian was appointed ambassador to Japan, but resigned the following year because of severe illness. On his way from Tokyo to China he died in Harbin. He was mistreated by the Islamic ritual in Harbin, causing the indignation of the local Armenians. The Armenian National Department of Harbin demanded Khan Masehian's coffin. After presenting relevant documents, the board members received the coffin, which was taken to the Armenian church in the presence of the local Armenian community. The funeral ceremony was held in an Armenian restaurant. He was buried in Tehran.

References

Politicians from Tehran
1864 births
1931 deaths
Armenian diplomats
Armenian male writers
Ethnic Armenian translators
Persian Armenians
Ambassadors of Iran to Germany
Ambassadors of Iran to Japan
Ambassadors of Iran to the United Kingdom
Armenian Representatives in National Consultative Assembly
19th-century Iranian writers
20th-century Iranian politicians
People of Qajar Iran